Yingtian may refer to:

 Empress Dowager Yingtian, Empress Dowager in Liao Dynasty
 Yingtian (Song Dynasty), ancient name of Shangqiu, Henan during the Song Dynasty
 Yingtian (Ming Dynasty), ancient name of Nanjing during the Ming Dynasty
 Yingtian, Miluo (营田镇), a town in Miluo City, Hunan province.

Historical eras
Yingtian (759), era name used by Shi Siming
Yingtian (783–784), era name used by Zhu Ci
Yingtian (911–913), era name used by Liu Shouguang
Yingtian (1206–1209), era name used by Emperor Xiangzong of Western Xia